Tiglath-Pileser may refer to:

Tiglath-Pileser I, king of Assyria from 1115 to 1077 BC
Tiglath-Pileser II, king of Assyria from 967 to 935 BC
Tiglath-Pileser III, king of Assyria from 745 to 727 BC
 Tiglath-Pileser, the cat in Agatha Christie's A Murder Is Announced